James Sargent (1824–1910) was an American locksmith and businessman.  He founded the Sargent and Greenleaf company.

Biography
Sargent was born in Chester, Vermont on December 1, 1824. He married Angelina Foster in 1847; they had one daughter.

In 1865, Sargent established the Sargent and Greenleaf company.

Later in life, he founded the Sargent Automated Railway Signal Company, one of several predecessors of the General Railway Signal company.

He died at his home in Rochester, New York on January 12, 1910, and was buried at Mount Hope Cemetery.

Notable innovations
 In 1857 Sargent had designed the "Sargent's Magnetic Bank Lock", said to be the first successful key changeable combination lock.

 In 1873 Sargent created the first time lock, using parts from eight-day clocks.

 In 1880 Sargent connected one of his combination locks to a delay timer, creating the first time-delay combination locks.

References

1824 births
1910 deaths
Burials at Mount Hope Cemetery (Rochester)
Businesspeople from Rochester, New York
Locksmiths
People from Chester, Vermont
19th-century American businesspeople